In molecular biology, the calponin family repeat is a 26 amino acid protein domain. Calponin 1 (CNN1) contains three copies of this domain. This domain is also found in vertebrate smooth muscle protein (SM22 or transgelin), and a number of other proteins whose physiological role is not yet established, including Drosophila synchronous flight muscle protein SM20, Caenorhabditis elegans unc-87 protein, rat neuronal protein NP25, and an Onchocerca volvulus antigen.

References

Protein domains